The Malayic languages are a branch of the Malayo-Polynesian subgroup of the Austronesian language family. The most prominent member is Malay, which is the national language of Brunei, Singapore and Malaysia; it further serves as basis for Indonesian, the national language of Indonesia. The Malayic branch also includes the local languages spoken by Indonesians and ethnic Malays (e.g. Banjarese, Kutai, Kedah Malay), further several languages spoken by various other ethnic groups of Sumatra, Indonesia (e.g. Minangkabau) and Borneo (e.g. Iban). The most probable candidate for the urheimat of the Malayic languages is western Borneo.

History
Dyen's "Malayic hesion" had a wider scope than the Malayic subgroup in its currently accepted form, and also included Acehnese, Lampung and Madurese.  narrowed down the range of Malayic, but included the non-Malayic languages Rejang and Embaloh:

Rejang
Embaloh
Salako
Iban-Malayan
Iban
Malayan

The present scope of the Malayic subgroup, which is now universally accepted by experts in the field, was first proposed by K.A. Adelaar (1992, 1993), based on phonological, morphological and lexical evidence.

Languages
Malayic languages are spoken on Borneo, Sumatra, the Malay Peninsula, Java and on several islands located in the South China Sea and the Strait of Malacca.

Borneo
Bamayo, Banjar, Berau, Brunei, Bukit, Kendayan, Keninjal, Kota Bangun Kutai, Tenggarong Kutai, Ibanic (Iban, Remun, Mualang, Seberuang)

Malay Peninsula
Jakun, Kedah, Kelantan-Patani, Negeri Sembilan, Orang Kanaq, Orang Seletar, Perak, Pahang, Reman, Temuan, Terengganu

Sumatra
Central Malay, Col, Haji, Jambi Malay, Kaur, Kerinci, Kubu, Lubu, Minangkabau, Musi, Pekal

Java
Betawi

South China Sea/Strait of Malacca
Bangka, Duano, Loncong, Orang Seletar, Urak Lawoi'

Subgrouping

Internal classification
While there is general consensus about which languages can be classified as Malayic, the internal subgrouping of the Malayic languages is still disputed.

Adelaar (1993)
Adelaar (1993) classifies the Malayic languages as follows.

Iban
(Main branch)
Standard Malay
Minangkabau
Middle Malay
Banjarese
Jakartanese
Others

Ross (2004)
Based on grammatical evidence, Ross (2004) divides the Malayic languages into two primary branches:

Western Malayic Dayak (Kendayan, Salako)
Nuclear Malayic (all other lects)

This classification is mirrored in the Glottolog (Version 3.4).

Anderbeck (2012)
Following , Anderbeck (2012) makes a distinction between Malay and Malayic in his discussion about the dialects of the Sea Tribes in Riau Archipelago. He tentatively classifies all Malayic languages as belonging to a "Malay" subgroup, except Ibanic, Kendayan/Selako, Keninjal, Malayic Dayak (or "Dayak Malayic") and the "fairly divergent varieties" of Urak Lawoi' and Duano.

Ibanic
Kendayan/Selako
Keninjal
Malayic Dayak
Urak Lawoi'
Duano
Malay (including all other Malayic varieties)

Anderbeck's classification has been adopted in the 17th edition of the Ethnologue, with the sole exception of Duano, which is listed in the Ethnologue among the "Malay" languages.

Smith (2017)
In his dissertation on the languages of Borneo, Smith (2017) provides evidence for a subgroup comprising Malayic isolects in western Borneo and southern Sumatra, which he labels "West Bornean Malayic". However, he leaves other isolects unclassified.

West Bornean Malayic
Kendayan-Salako (= Ross' "Western Malayic Dayak")
Besemah
Ibanic
Iban
Seberuang
Mualang
Keninjal
Other Malayic (not a genetic subgroup)
Standard Malay 
Betawi
Ketapang
Banjarese
Kutai
Brunei Malay

Position within Austronesian
The inclusion of the Malayic languages within the Malayo-Polynesian subgroup is undisputed, and there is general consensus that the Chamic languages are closely related to Malayic. The wider affiliations of the Malayic languages are however controversial. There are two major proposals: Adelaar (2005) places Malayic within the Malayo-Sumbawan subgroup, which comprises the following languages:

Malayo-Sumbawan
Malayo-Chamic-BSS
Malayic languages
Chamic languages
Bali-Sasak-Sumbawa languages
Sundanese
Madurese

Blust (2010) and Smith (2017) assign Malayic to the Greater North Borneo subgroup:

Greater North Borneo
North Borneo languages
Central Sarawak languages
Kayan–Murik languages
Land Dayak languages
Malayo–Chamic
Chamic languages
Malayic languages
Rejang language
Sundanese language

The Malayo-Sumbawan hypothesis is mainly based on phonological evidence with a few shared lexical innovations, while the Greater North Borneo hypothesis is based on a large corpus of lexical evidence.

Proto-Malayic

Phonology
Proto-Malayic has a total of 19 consonants and 4 vowels.

There are 2 diphthongs:
 *-ay
 *-aw

Word structure
Proto-Malayic lexemes are mostly disyllabic, though some have one, three, or four syllables. Lexemes have the following syllable structure:

Note: C = consonant, V = vowel, N = nasal

Notes

References

Citations

Bibliography

  
 
 
 
 
 
 
 
 Nothofer, Bernd. 1975. The reconstruction of Proto-Malayo-Javanic. (Verhandelingen van het KITLV, 73.) The Hague: Nijhoff.
 
 
 
 

 
Languages of Indonesia
Languages of Malaysia
Malayo-Chamic languages